Journey or journeying may refer to:
 Travel, the movement of people between distant geographical locations
 Day's journey, a measurement of distance
 Road trip, a long-distance journey on the road

Animals
 Journey (horse), a thoroughbred racehorse
 Journey (wolf) or OR-7, a gray wolf being electronically tracked in the Northwest United States

Arts, entertainment, and media

Films 
 Journey (1972 film), a 1972 Canadian film directed by Paul Almond
 Journey (1995 film), a 1995 Hallmark Hall of Fame TV film
 Journey (2004 film), a 2004 short film written and directed by Christine Shin
 Journey, a Telugu dubbed movie of original Tamil movie Engaeyum Eppothum

Literature 
 Journey (novel), a 1989 historical novel by James Michener
 A Journey (2010), Tony Blair's memoirs
 Journey (picture book), a 2013 children's book by Aaron Becker
 Journey: The Adventures of Wolverine MacAlistaire, a 1983 comic by William Messner-Loebs

Music 
 Journey (band), an American rock band

Television 
 Pokémon Journeys: The Series, the 23rd season of Pokémon anime (2019)
 Pokémon Master Journeys: The Series, the follow-up 24th season (2020)
 Pokémon Ultimate Journeys: The Series, the follow-up 25th season (2021)

Albums
 Journey (Archie Roach album), a 2007 album
 Journey (Colin Blunstone album), a 1974 pop album
 Journey (Fourplay album), a 2004 jazz album
 Journey (Journey album), their 1975 debut album
 Journey (McCoy Tyner album), a 1993 jazz album
 Journey (Shota Shimizu album), a 2010 R&B J-pop album
 Journey (W-inds. album), a 2007 J-pop album
 Journey (Yeng Constantino album), a 2008 Filipino pop rock album
 Journey (Arif Mardin album)
 Journey (Kingdom Come album)
 Journey (Trio X album)
 Journey, an album by Ali Akbar Khan
 Journey (Kyla EP), a 2014 EP by Filipino R&B singer Kyla
 Journey (Henry EP), a 2020 EP by Canadian singer Henry

Songs
 "Journey" (Duncan Browne song), a 1972 hit song by Duncan Browne
 "Journey (Kimi to Futari de)", a song by Crystal Kay's album Spin the Music (2010)
 "Journey" / "Is It OK?", Korean song by TVXQ
 "The Journey", a song by Mott the Hoople on the 1971 album Brain Capers

Video games 
 Journey (1983 video game), a 1983 arcade game featuring the band
 Journey (1989 video game), a 1989 computer game by Infocom
 Journey (2012 video game), a 2012 PlayStation 3 game by thatgamecompany

Vehicles
 Dodge Journey, a mid-size SUV built between 2008 and 2020
 Isuzu Journey, a minibus built since 1970
 Wuling Zhengcheng or Wuling Journey, a minivan built since 2014

Other uses
 Journeys (journal), an academic journal published by Berghahn Books
 Journeys (company), a shoe store chain owned by Genesco
 Journey (NGO), a Maldives-based non-governmental organization
 Journey (given name)
 William Journey (1915–2002), American 20th century politician, Missouri senator

See also
 Journy, a commune in the Pas-de-Calais département in the Hauts-de-France region of France
 The Journey (disambiguation)
 Travel (disambiguation)
 Adventure, an exciting experience that is typically a bold undertaking
 Exploration, searching for the purpose of discovery of information or resources